Oleg Leonov may refer to:

 Oleg Leonov (footballer)
 Oleg Leonov (politician)